Xixia (1038–1227) was a Tanggut-ruled empire in northwestern China.

Xixia may also refer to:

Xixia County (西峡县), in Nanyang, Henan
Xixia District (西夏区), in Yinchuan, Ningxia, named after the empire
Xixia, Jiangxi (溪霞镇), a town in Nanchang, Jiangxi

See also
Xi Qia or Xi Xia (1883–1950), Chinese general